Alexandra "Ale" Benado Vergara (born 11 May 1976) is a Chilean politician, LGBT rights activist and former football player and manager. She played as a midfielder and has been a member of the Chile women's national team. Since 11 March 2022, she has been serving  as Minister of Sports of Chile.

Early life
Benado was born on 11 May 1976 in Stockholm, Sweden to Chilean parents, a Jewish father and a non-Jewish mother. She lived the following years in France, where she started playing football. Her mother, Lucía Vergara, was a militant of the Revolutionary Left Movement. After Vergara's murder in Chile in 1983, she left Europe and moved to Cuba. She settled in Chile in early 1990s.

Club career
Benado joined Sportivo Milano de Colina in 1993. She moved to CD Palestino the following year. She retired from her playing career following an injury prior the 2003 South American Women's Football Championship. However, she came out of retirement in September 2009, after Spanish football manager Marta Tejedor, who was coaching the Chile women's national team, requested her to come back and be a role model for Chile's next generation players, including Christiane Endler and Yanara Aedo. She was playing for Provincial Osorno until her definitive retirement in 2011.

International career
Benado represented Chile at the 2010 South American Women's Football Championship.

Personal life
Benado is openly lesbian.

References

External links

1976 births
Living people
Citizens of Chile through descent
Chilean women's footballers
Women's association football midfielders
Chile women's international footballers
Chilean football managers
Women's association football managers
Chilean politicians
Chilean LGBT rights activists
Chilean women's rights activists
Chilean emigrants to France
Chilean emigrants to Cuba
Chilean people of Jewish descent
Lesbian sportswomen
Lesbian politicians
LGBT association football players
Chilean LGBT sportspeople
Chilean LGBT politicians
Chilean lesbians
Footballers from Stockholm
Politicians from Stockholm
Swedish women's footballers
Swedish football managers
Swedish politicians
Swedish LGBT rights activists
Swedish women's rights activists
Swedish emigrants to France
Immigrants to Cuba
People of Chilean-Jewish descent
Swedish people of Chilean descent
Swedish LGBT sportspeople
Swedish LGBT politicians
Swedish lesbians
Chilean Ministers of Sport
Women government ministers of Chile